Mairéad Farrell (born 6 January 1990) is an Irish Sinn Féin politician who has been a Teachta Dála (TD) for the Galway West constituency since the 2020 general election.

Early life and education
Farrell is from the Mervue area in Galway City. Her father, Niall, is an anti-war activist and her aunt, also called Mairéad Farrell, was a member of the Provisional Irish Republican Army who became one of the Gibraltar Three (three PIRA members killed by the British SAS in Gibraltar).

Farrell holds a Bachelor of Arts in Economics and History from NUI Galway and a Master of Science in Finance from Queen's University Belfast.

Political career
Farrell sat on Sinn Féin's National Youth Committee for five years. She represented the Galway City East local electoral area on Galway City Council from 2014 to 2019. She became a TD for Galway West in February 2020 at that year's General Election.
She is Sinn Féin's Spokesperson on Public Expenditure and Reform. She appeared on the Irish Times list of  top 50 young people to watch in 2021 as well as one of 10 TDs making a name for themselves since the 2020 election in the Irish Examiner.

Farrell is a regular contributor to Irish and international media and has written for the Irish Times, the Irish Examiner and international publications such as CounterPunch.

References

External links
Sinn Féin profile

1990 births
Living people
21st-century women Teachtaí Dála
Alumni of the University of Galway
Alumni of Queen's University Belfast
Irish socialists
Local councillors in Galway (city)
Members of the 33rd Dáil
Politicians from County Galway
Sinn Féin TDs (post-1923)